Tào Thế Lệ Thu, stage name Hồ Lệ Thu (Hanoi, October 19, 1973) is a female pop singer from northern Vietnam.

Biography 

Hồ Lệ Thu was born in Hà Nội, Vietnam. She started to exhibit her ambition for singing at a very early age, and when she was 10 years old, she attended the Labor Theatre House, a Vietnamese children's singing club. Many other Vietnamese singing artists, including Như Quỳnh and Phương Thanh, also attended this club.

Throughout Hồ Lệ Thu's teenage years, she participated in many singing competitions, and won many awards competing against Sài Gòn in secondary school. Thu eventually joined an amateur music band and starting to sing everywhere around Việt Nam.

In 1991, Thu's big chance came when a singing contest was held in Sài Gòn, and she performed very well, receiving second prize, losing only to Như Quỳnh who won first prize.

After this, Thu received many invitations for shows and truly started to be recognized as a professional singer. Right now she is a singer for a program called Paris By Night produced by Thúy Nga, since DVD Paris By Night 73: Song Ca Đặc Biệt – The Best of Duets.

HOA THIEN TAM Charity Foundation was founded by Ho Le Thu in the United States. The foundation was established to fund Vocational Rehabilitation for Poor Disabled Youth in Vietnam to get a new start in life.

Discography

Solo albums

Movies 

Cánh Cửa Cuộc Đời
Đất Lạ
Long Xích Lô
 Đâu Phải Vợ Người Ta

Trivia 
 Hồ Lệ Thu's favourite color is pink
 Hồ Lệ Thu lived in France
 Hồ Lệ Thu won the second prize of the Tiếng Hát Truyền Hình

References

External links 
  OfficialMySpace
  Thuy Nga-Paris By Night Official Website

1973 births
Living people
People from Hanoi
21st-century Vietnamese women singers
20th-century Vietnamese women singers